Joseph Wright Twinam (July 11, 1934 – June 12, 2001) was an American diplomat with a focus on the Middle East. Ambassador Twinam was the first U.S. ambassador accredited solely to Bahrain, serving from 1974 to 1976. He served as Deputy Assistant Secretary of State for Near Eastern & South Asian Affairs, from 1979 to 1982. He then served three years as dean of the Foreign Service Institute & as diplomat-in-residence at the University of Virginia (UVA), finally retiring from the State Department in 1985. He subsequently was a distinguished visiting professor at the Citadel for eight years, and an adjunct professor at Southern Methodist University from 1998 to 1999. He died in Charleston, South Carolina from injuries sustained in a fall. A member of Phi Beta Kappa, it was revealed on his death that Twinam was also a member of the Seven Society at UVA.

Writings

References

1934 births
2001 deaths
People from Chattanooga, Tennessee
Ambassadors of the United States to Bahrain
The Citadel, The Military College of South Carolina faculty
University of Virginia alumni
United States Department of State officials
United States Foreign Service personnel
20th-century American diplomats